Landing High Japan (ランディングハイジャパン) is an arcade video game in which the object is to pilot a commercial airliner, taking off from and landing at several Japanese airports. It is a part of the Landing series of airline simulation arcade games which also includes Midnight Landing (1987), Top Landing (1988) and Landing Gear (1995).

The game is available in both 29" and 50" versions.

Gameplay
The player pilots commercial aircraft simulating the experience of realistic commercial flights. The player is required to master all the intricate steps and maintain a smooth flight for the passengers. The player must follow the red and green markers that indicates the proper flight path during each landing and takeoff phase. The player is required to follow every step including communication with the co-pilot and the tower by pressing the Speak Button.

The game has two modes including Training Flight, where players can perform 3 landings with explanations of the piloting system, and Airline Flight, where players can select any of 6 airports in Japan. During gameplay, the player takes off once, and thereafter conducts mostly landings at every selected destination airport. All Nippon Airways is product-placed as the airline in the game. The game has 5 realistic commercial aircraft, including the Boeing 747-481D, Boeing 767-281, Boeing 767-381, Boeing 777-281 and Boeing 777-381. Players can choose two different piloting systems including Automatic, where players use the flight yoke and rudder pedals, and Manual, where the player is given additional controls, using the thrust throttle, flaps setting buttons, and the cockpit display screen change button. There is a small LCD monitor above the yoke that has 4 configuration displays, including horizon indicators, engine operation, airspeed, and altitude.

The six airports include Osaka, Hiroshima, Naha, Sapporo, Tokyo, and Fukuoka. During gameplay, the player takes off once, and thereafter conducts mostly landings at every selected destination airport. In Training Flight, players cannot choose their own airport. Inclement weather including clouds, rain, thunderstorms, and snow may be encountered. Time of day is also featured in the game. During each landing in Airline Mode, wind speed and wind direction are shown and the flight path and wind patterns become more difficult with each successive landing as players progress.

A landing can end with several different results, including "Clear," "Bad Landing," "Course Out", "Go-around", "Over Run", and "Crash".  After each landing, points are granted or deducted based on piloting evaluation, course evaluation, and passenger evaluation. An adequate number of points must be achieved in order to get a "Clear" result and advance to the next airport. The final score is calculated by adding up totals from each landing and dividing by the number of attempts. Erratic flying, such as *High Speed Bank", "Inclination Too Great", "Stall", "Verification Ignored" can cost players points. The passengers' stress level is also featured depending on how the aircraft is being flown. Smooth flying remains it at green, turning to purple and red for unusual flying. When the stress level meter is full, it indicates that they have become angry, costing players points.

During gameplay, the copilot will occasionally make comments, such as "Captain, we are veering off course" or "Captain, we are in danger of stalling out". He also announces when the aircraft reaches V1 speed, V2 speed, and VR speed during takeoff. In addition, he carries out certain orders such as lowering the landing gear (subsequently confirming, "Gear down, three green", implying that the three green Down-Locked indicator lights are on. The control tower and flight attendant also are briefly heard from at the beginning of the takeoff phase. The ground proximity warning system and realistic cockpit alarm sounds are also heard frequently.

References

1999 video games
Flight simulation video games
Arcade video games
Arcade-only video games
Taito arcade games
Video games developed in Japan
Video games set in Japan